The Brass Era Rex cyclecar was manufactured by the Rex Motor Company in Detroit, Michigan in 1914.

History 
C. H. Blomstrom had been involved with the Queen, Blomstrom, Gyroscope, Car De Luxe and the Lion when he turned to developing a cyclecar.  Unusual for cyclecars, the Rex had front-wheel drive. The friction transmission had its discs at the front of the engine instead of the rear. The water-cooled four-cylinder 18-hp engine of the Rex was designed by Blomstrom. The car was on a 100-inch wheelbase, with a 48-inch tread.  A side-by-side two-seater, the Rex weighed 580 pounds and was priced at $395, . Very few were made.

References

Defunct motor vehicle manufacturers of the United States
Defunct manufacturing companies based in Detroit
Motor vehicle manufacturers based in Michigan
Vehicle manufacturing companies established in 1914
Vehicle manufacturing companies disestablished in 1915
Cyclecars
Brass Era vehicles
1900s cars
Cars introduced in 1914